Deposed Princess Yeondeok of the Incheon Yi clan (d. 4 August 1139) was a Korean queen consort as the 1st wife of her nephew, King Injong of Goryeo. It was said that she was possessed of beauty and gentleness, and an unblemished character. She was the second, alongside Queen Sundeok (initially older sister and later mother-in-law) and Princess Bokchang.

Life
Injong was afraid that Yeondeok's father, Yi Ja-gyeom (이자겸), who was the most powerful noble at that time, would give the throne to another prince, thus diluting and splitting power. Hoping to avoid this, Injong forced Yeondeok to become his Queen Consort.

On 8th months 1124 (according to the lunar calendar), she formally become his Queen consort, entered the Palace, and was honoured as Princess Yeondeok (연덕궁주, 延德宮主). According to "Dongguk Tonggam" (동국통감), on the day she became queen it rained a great deal, the wind blew strongly, and the trees were uprooted.

Meanwhile, on 20 June 1126 (4th year reign of Injong), Princess Yeondeok's father was ousted.  Follpwing this, some of Injong's servants said
"The Princess couldn't be the king's queen consort as she was a close relative from his maternal side"(궁주는 왕의 종모(從母)이니 왕후가 될 수 없다)
Afterwards, she and her younger sister were deposed from their positions and became simply Lady Yi (이씨). Even after she was deposed, Injong, and other reigning kings, continued to treat generously. She died on 4 August, 1139, without any children.

References

External links
Deposed Princess Yeondeok on Encykorea .
폐비 이씨 자매 on EToday News .
Deposed Princess Yeondeok on Goryeosa 
폐비 이씨 on Doosan Encyclopedia .
 

12th-century births
Year of birth unknown
1139 deaths
Royal consorts of the Goryeo Dynasty
Korean queens consort
12th-century Korean women